Emanuele "Lino" Saputo,  (born June 10, 1937) is an Italian-Canadian billionaire businessman. He is the founder of the Canadian cheese manufacturer Saputo Inc. According to Forbes, he has an estimated net worth of US$4.7 billion as of November 2022.

Early life 
Saputo was born in Montelepre, Sicily, Italy, in 1937, to Giuseppe Saputo, a cheesemaker, and his wife Maria. He completed his secondary schooling in the early 1950s, and shortly thereafter, the Saputo family immigrated to Montreal, Quebec.

Career 
Saputo became chairman of the board and president of Saputo Inc. in 1969, and he was named chairman and chief executive officer (CEO) in 1997 when the company went public. In March 2004, his son Lino Saputo Jr. was appointed to the position of president and CEO, while Saputo continued as the company's chairman. In August 2017, Lino Saputo Jr. assumed the role of chairman, and Saputo remains the majority shareholder of Saputo Inc.

Possible links to the Mafia have been raised in the past, more recently in January 2020 with Radio-Canada investigative program Enquête. Saputo has repeatedly denied those allegations, writing in his book Entrepreneur: Living our dreams: "We respected the law, kept our distance from criminal organizations, and avoided crossing the wrong people".

Saputo was named in the 2017 Paradise Papers because he held shares in an offshore company, an aviation company, in Bermuda which he had sold off in 2010. A spokesperson said that "was justified for business reasons and not for fiscal considerations".

Other interests 
Saputo owns a significant stake in a trucking company, TransForce, and has extensive investments in real estate, forest products, hotels and golf courses.

Saputo committed C$7.5 million towards the construction of Montreal Impact's Saputo Stadium at Olympic Park in July 2006.

Honours 
In 2011, he was made an Officer of the National Order of Quebec. He was appointed a Member of the Order of Canada (CM) in 2012, per the Government House announcement on June 29, 2012, and the Canada Gazette on September 1, 2012.

His son Lino Saputo Jr. was named "Canada's Outstanding CEO of the Year" for 2019 by the Financial Post.

See also 
 List of cheesemakers

References 

1937 births
Living people
People from Montelepre
Canadian billionaires
Canadian people of Sicilian descent
Cheesemakers
Businesspeople from Sicily
Italian emigrants to Canada
Officers of the National Order of Quebec
Members of the Order of Canada
Businesspeople from Montreal
People from Senneville, Quebec
Naturalized citizens of Canada
People named in the Paradise Papers